Tin Yiu is an MTR Light Rail stop. It is located at ground level at Tin Shui Road near Tin Yiu Estate in Tin Shui Wai, Yuen Long District. It began service on 10 January 1993 and belongs to Zone 4. It serves Tin Yiu Estate and Tin Shing Court.

History
The station opened on 10 January 1993 as part of the 2.7-km Tin Shui Wai Extension project, built by KCR to serve the developing Tin Shui Wai New Town. It was initially served by Route 721 from Tin Shui Wai to Yuen Long. Two months later, on 27 March 1993, an additional service (route 722) commenced between Tin Shui Wai and Siu Hong.

Tin Yiu stop no longer provides direct service to Tuen Mun. Passengers must take West Rail or transfer to route 751 at Hang Mei Tsuen stop.

Physical description
Tin Yiu stop has two covered, open-air side platforms, each long enough to accommodate a two-car train. The shelters cover the full length of both platforms.

The platforms can be entered from both their north and south ends. The northern ends of both platforms are accessible by ramps, whereas stairs are provided at the southern ends. There are pedestrian level crossings at either end of the station.

The light rail stop is located next to the Tin Yiu Bus Terminus.

Gallery

References

MTR Light Rail stops
Former Kowloon–Canton Railway stations
Tin Shui Wai
Railway stations in Hong Kong opened in 1993
MTR Light Rail stops named from housing estates